Carolina Yanuzzi is an Argentinian beauty pageant title holder. She was crowned Miss Argentina 2013 and will represent Argentina at the Miss Earth 2014
Titles:
Second maid of honor in queen of the students 2005, in argentina
Girl show mach, in argentina
Second national princess in miss universe 2013, in argentina
Girl "faces glam" argentina, in miami
Miss argentina 2014, in argentina
Conrad angels argentina 2014, in uruguay.
Queen of the turf 2014, in argentina
Miss atlantico argentina 2015, in uruguay
Miss bikini argentina 2015, in china

References

Argentine beauty pageant winners
Living people
Year of birth missing (living people)